Vas is a small village on the left bank of the Kolpa River southwest of Fara in the Municipality of Kostel in southern Slovenia. The area is part of the traditional region of Lower Carniola and is now included in the Southeast Slovenia Statistical Region.

History
The Vas–Fara volunteer fire department became a founding unit of the Kočevje municipal fire department on 28 August 1955.

Cultural heritage
There is a small chapel-shrine in the settlement dedicated to the Virgin Mary. It dates to the early 20th century.

References

External links
Vas on Geopedia

Populated places in the Municipality of Kostel